Bagta is a village in Kamrup rural district, in the state of Assam, India, situated near north bank of river Brahmaputra.

Transport
The village is near National Highway 427  and connected to nearby towns and cities with regular buses and other modes of transportation.

See also
 Bakalipara
 Balapukhri

References

Villages in Kamrup district